Prince Mohammad bin Abdulaziz International Airport or Medina Airport  is a regional airport in Medina, Saudi Arabia. Opened in 1950, it handles domestic flights, while it has scheduled international services to regional destinations such as Cairo, Dubai, Istanbul and Kuwait City. Medina Airport also handles charter international flights during the Hajj and Umrah seasons. The Pilgrims for Hajj and Umrah can enter Saudi Arabia through this airport or through Jeddah Airport only. It is the fourth busiest airport in Saudi Arabia, handling 8,144,790 passengers in 2018.

Overview

The existing airport achieved international status in 2007. The winning consortium comprised TAV Airports of Turkey and Saudi Oger Limited and Al Rajhi Holding Group, both of Saudi Arabia. In October 2011, the consortium entered into a contract with the Civil Aviation Authority of Saudi Arabia (GACA) to build and operate the Prince Muhammad Bin Abdulaziz International Airport in Al Madinah Al-Munawarah under a 25-year concession. The project reached financial close on 30 June 2012, securing a total of US$1.2 billion financing package from a club of Saudi Arabian banks. The project has been structured as a Build-Transfer-Operate (BTO) project so that GACA retains ownership of the airport infrastructure. The consortium, through the special purpose vehicle incorporated for the project, TIBAH Airports Development Company Limited, will be responsible for the management of the airport, including airside and landside operations. GACA will continue to act as regulator and will be responsible for air traffic control operation.

The 25 year concession is the first full public private partnership (PPP) project in Saudi Arabia. The project has an initial build cost of US$1.2 billion and which may, with future investments and expansions, increase to US$1.5 billion. Whilst there are a number of major transport projects in the pipeline in the GCC region, it was the largest infrastructure project to close in 2012. The three lenders – National Commercial Bank, Arab National Bank and Saudi British Bank – provided a US$1.2 billion Islamic financing package comprising a three-year US$436 million commodity Murabaha equity bridge facility, an 18-year US$719 million procurement facility (in several tranches) and a US$23 million working capital facility. The facilities were primarily denominated in Saudi Riyals (SAR).

Madinah Airport has been awarded Leadership in Energy and Environmental Design (LEED) Gold certification for the recent terminal expansion from the U.S. Green Building Council (USGBC). LEED certification is considered the industry standard in defining and measuring "green," sustainable construction. The award makes Madinah Airport home to the first LEED Gold certified commercial airport terminal in MENA region, demonstrating Madinah Airport's commitment to environment, sustainability, passenger comfort, and efficiency. The Project has also been awarded for Middle East Infrastructure Deal of the Year (2013) by Project Finance International Middle East & Africa Awards, and Best Islamic Finance Project Finance Deal of the Year (2013) by Euromoney Islamic Finance Awards.

New Madinah airport test operations began on 12 April 2015. A Saudia domestic flight coming from Riyadh landed at 11 a.m. at the new Prince Muhammad bin Abdul Aziz International Airport in Madinah, marking the start of the airport's test run operations. Flight SV1435 was the first to land at the airport. Another aircraft, flight SV1476, then took off at 11:45, the first ever to take off from the new facility.

Custodian of the Two Holy Mosques King Salman opened the new Prince Mohammed bin Abdul Aziz International Airport in Madinah on 2 July 2015. The airport project was announced as the world's best by Engineering News-Record's 3rd Annual Global Best Projects Competition held on 10 September 2015. The airport also received the first Leadership in Energy and Environmental Design (LEED) Gold certificate in the MENA region. The airport is named after Crown Prince Muhammad bin Abdulaziz Al Saud .

Airlines and destinations

Statistics

Accidents and incidents
 On 16 March 2001, the airport was the scene of a bloody end to the hijacking of a Russian-based Vnukovo Airlines Tupolev Tu-154 jet bound from Istanbul to Moscow carrying 162 passengers. The hijackers, apparently Chechen Separatists, had landed at the airport and had demanded additional amount of fuel to fly to Afghanistan. After 18 hours of no negotiations, Saudi Security forces stormed the plane bringing an end to the hijack. There were three fatalities, including a hijacker, a Turkish passenger, and a Russian Air stewardess.
 On 5 January 2014, a Saudia Boeing 767-300, flight SV2841 from Mashhad, Iran made an emergency landing after one of its main landing gear failed to deploy. The aircraft was traveling from the Iranian city of Mashhad with 315 passengers on board, 29 people were injured as they exited the aircraft that was in a nose-up position, 11 were taken to hospital, while the rest were treated at the airport's medical center.

See also
List of airports in Saudi Arabia
Transportation in Saudi Arabia
Amaala International airport

References

External links

 Official website

1974 establishments in Saudi Arabia
Airports established in 1974
Airports in Saudi Arabia
Buildings and structures in Medina